Oak Academy (formerly Oakmead College of Technology) is a co-educational secondary school located in the northern outskirts of Bournemouth in the English county of Dorset.

History
Previously a foundation school administered by Bournemouth Borough Council, in December 2012 Oakmead College of Technology converted to academy status and was renamed Oak Academy. The school is now sponsored by the Ambitions Academies Trust due to a legacy of low expectations and low exam outcomes for students. The current OFSTED rating is "Requires Improvement."

The school previously operated a sixth Form provision, but it was suspended in July 2018 due to low pupil numbers.

In September 2012 the school was the temporary location of the new LeAF Studio before the studio school was relocated to its own building in September 2013.

Buildings
The school is divided into blocks A and B (the original girl's and boy's schools).

A Block contains the following curriculum areas: English and Science, French & Spanish, Health & Social Care, Business and a media classroom. It also contains an assembly hall (hall A), a playground, the sports hall, one IT room, eight science labs, the library and two modern foreign language rooms.

B Block contains other curriculum areas: Geography, History, ICT & Computer Science, Drama, Music and Design & Technology, Sociology and Psychology. There are 5 Design & Technology rooms — one Food Technology room, one Resistant Materials room, one Graphics room, one Art room and one Electronics room. This section of the school also contains four ICT rooms, one Music room, another assembly hall (hall B), a playground, the canteen, the Inclusion Support Centre, and the main administrative offices.

A recently refurbished block now houses all of the Maths lessons delivered at the Academy.

References

External links
Oak Academy official website
Ambitions Academies Trust official website

Schools in Bournemouth
Secondary schools in Bournemouth, Christchurch and Poole
Academies in Bournemouth, Christchurch and Poole